Diego Gutiérrez  (born September 25, 1974) is a Cuban singer-songwriter. In 2018, Gutiérrez was nominated for his album Palante el Mambo! to the Latin Grammy Award for Best Tropical Fusion Album.

Early years 
Diego Gutiérrez was born in Ciego de Ávila, where he lived during his childhood and adolescence. His brothers taught him to play the guitar, being themselves self-taught, and soon he began to sing the Trova Tradicional Cuban classics and also the songs of the Nueva Trova movement. Since he was little he got the influences of Cuban country and popular music through the old vinyls listened at home, which marked his compositions to come.

He began to write his own songs at the Central University of Las Villas, where he found a powerful cultural movement which inspired and drove him to think seriously in developing his musical career, while studying English Language and Literature. First he got known by a growing audience through amateur musicians festivals, where he won several awards, and later through concerts and tours around his country.

Career 
In 1997, he founded together with other fellow troubadours in Santa Clara the site of singing-songwriting called La Trovuntivitis, based in El Mejunje. This is an iconic cultural Center in Cuba, from where new generations of musicians, singer-songwriters and artists have emerged. Also around the same year they all together founded the national festival of trovadours "Longina".

He has been invited to share the stage with well-known singer-songwriters from Cuba like Carlos Varela, David Torrens, Santiago Feliú among other important musicians and participated in a concert invited by Manu Chao, together with La Trovuntivitis, as part as a Cuban tour by this artist.

In 2006, Gutiérrez recorded his first studio album titled De cero  which received three nominations and two Cubadisco Awards.

He has participated as an invited musician in the World Festival of Youth and Students in Algiers (2001) and in Caracas (2005). He was invited to the 2009 edition of Barnasants International singer-songwriters festival in Barcelona and later performed a series of concerts in Sevilla, Valencia and Madrid.

For his second studio album titled Palante el Mambo! he received a Cubadisco Award and a nomination to the Latin Grammy Awards in 2018.

In 2019, he launched his third studio release titled Piloto automático.

As a result of his work throughout the years putting into music the verses of various writers from Villa Clara, in 2021 Diego Gutiérrez released his more recent album Viaje al Centro de la Tierra.

Gutiérrez has brought his work to United States, Spain, United Kingdom, Argentina, Switzerland, Mexico, Venezuela , Cyprus, Uruguay, Algeria and Bolivia as a part of tours, festivals and concerts.

He is a member of the Latin Academy of Recording Arts & Sciences.

Discography

Studio albums 
 2006: De cero
 2018: Palante el Mambo!
 2019: Piloto automático
 2021: Viaje al Centro de la Tierra

Live album 
 2008: Demasiado Diego  Recorded live in Centro Pablo de la Torriente Brau, La Habana.

Various artists albums and anthologies 
 2001: Trov@nónima.cu
 2003: Acabo de soñar, poems of José Martí sung by young Cuban troubadours
 2005: A guitarra limpia. Antología 4 (collective work)
 2006: Te doy una canción Vol.1, tribute to Silvio Rodríguez
 2007: Décimas del gato Simón, poems by Josefina de Diego.
 2009: Del verso a la canción various artists
 2018: La Trovuntivitis 2022: La Nueva Trova y más. 50 años'', Vol.9

Awards and nominations 

 A Latin Grammy Award is an accolade by the Latin Academy of Recording Arts & Sciences to recognize outstanding achievement in the music industry.

 Cubadisco is the most important music festival and awards event celebrating Cuban music in this country and every year it recognizes the achievements in Cuban discography.

 The Lucas Awards (Spanish: Premios Lucas) are awarded in Cuba for best music video.

References

External links 
 Diego Gutiérrez YouTube Channel
 Diego Gutiérrez Discography on Discogs

Cuban songwriters
Cuban male singer-songwriters
People from Ciego de Ávila
Latin pop singers
University "Marta Abreu" of Las Villas alumni
21st-century Cuban male singers
Latin music songwriters
1974 births
Living people